Polygonum tenue, the slender knotweed or pleat-leaf knotweed, is a North American species of plants in the buckwheat family. it is widespread across south-central Canada (Ontario) and the eastern and central United States from Maine to Georgia, west as far as Minnesota, South Dakota, Nebraska, and Texas (though apparently now extirpated from Maine and New Hampshire).

Stems are green or brown, not wiry. Flowers are pink or white.

References

External links
photo of herbarium specimen at Missouri Botanical Garden, collected in Missouri in 1990

tenue
Flora of North America
Plants described in 1803